St. Michael Airport  is a state-owned, public-use airport located two nautical miles (4 km) west of the central business district of St. Michael, a city in the Nome Census Area of the U.S. state of Alaska.

Facilities 
It has one runway designated 2/20 with a 4,001 x 75 ft (1,220 x 23 m) gravel surface.

Airlines and destinations 

Prior to its bankruptcy and cessation of all operations, Ravn Alaska served the airport from multiple locations.

References

External links 
 FAA Alaska airport diagram (GIF)
 

Airports in the Nome Census Area, Alaska